Estakhrak may refer to:
 Estakhrak, Sistan and Baluchestan
 Estakhrak, South Khorasan